WKLG (102.1 FM, "Star 102.1") is a radio station broadcasting an adult contemporary music format. Licensed to Rock Harbor, Florida, the station serves the upper Florida Keys and southern Miami-Dade area.  The station is currently owned by WKLG, Inc.

References

External links

KLG
Mainstream adult contemporary radio stations in the United States